Shadi Hamsho was born on August 10, 1981 in Damascus, Syria. He is an undefeated professional boxer with a record of 10 wins, 0 losses and 3 knockouts.

Personal life
Hamsho grew up in Malmö, Sweden. He now runs a boxing gym and works as a trainer in Stavanger, Norway.

Career
He was trained by world famous trainer Freddie Roach.

Amateur Record

 Scandinavian champion

References

External links
 Official Site

Living people
1981 births
Syrian male boxers